Jack Fisk (born December 19, 1945) is an American production designer and director.

As a production designer, he is known for his collaborations with Terrence Malick, designing all of his first eight films including Badlands (1973), Days of Heaven (1978), The Thin Red Line (1998), and The Tree of Life (2011). His other credits include Phantom of the Paradise (1974), Carrie (1976), Eraserhead (1977), Heart Beat (1980), The Straight Story (1999), Mulholland Drive (2001), Water for Elephants (2011), and The Master (2012). He was nominated for the Academy Award for Best Production Design for There Will Be Blood (2007) and The Revenant (2015).

Fisk made his directorial debut with Raggedy Man (1981) and went on to direct the films Violets Are Blue (1986), Daddy's Dyin': Who's Got the Will? (1990), Final Verdict (1991), and two episodes of the television series On the Air (1992).

Career
Fisk was art director on Brian De Palma's Carrie (1976), in which his wife, Sissy Spacek, played the title role. He frequently collaborates with directors Terrence Malick and David Lynch (whom he has known since childhood). His production design and art director credits include all of Malick's first eight feature films and Lynch's The Straight Story (1999) and Mulholland Drive (2001). He was nominated for the Academy Award for Best Art Direction for Paul Thomas Anderson's There Will Be Blood. He received his second Academy Award nomination for the film The Revenant at the 88th Academy Awards.

Fisk appeared in Lynch's Eraserhead (1977) as the Man in the Planet, and the film's credits give "special thanks" to him and to Sissy Spacek (who reputedly held the slates between takes).

Fisk directed Spacek in the films Raggedy Man and Violets Are Blue with Kevin Kline.

Personal life
Fisk met his wife, Spacek, while working on Terrence Malick's 1973 film Badlands, where she portrayed the aloof and distant version of Caril Ann Fugate. They married on April 12, 1974. They have two daughters, Schuyler Fisk (born 1982), also an actress, and Madison Fisk (born 1988), a painter.

Filmography

References

External links

 Eraserhead Interview

1945 births
Living people
American art directors
People from Canton, Illinois
American production designers
Film directors from Illinois